The Wuling Hongtu is a five-door, five- to eight-seater Microvan made by SGMW (SAIC-GM-Wuling Automobile), a Chinese joint venture of SAIC with Liuzhou Wuling Motors Co and the American automotive company General Motors. Unlike the company's earlier Mitsubishi-based products, the Hongtu is an independent development. Codenamed LZW 6381B3, the Hongtu is also marketed as the Wuling Journey and Sunshine (the cargo version - confusing, as there is another car called the Wuling Journey and Wuling Sunshine in other markets) in Singapore, and Chevrolet N200 (Latin America, North Africa, Middle East).

Specifications

The LZW 6381B3 Hongtu is equipped with Wuling's own B-series four cylinder engine of 1.2 litres displacement (engine code LAQ). The Singaporean market Sunshine and Journey receive the modelcode LZW 6381C3, the one-letter difference denoting its being equipped with the older 1.1-litre LJ465Q3-1 engine, which is based on the thirty-year-old Suzuki F10A.

Suspension is independent by MacPherson struts in front, with either leaf springs or coil springs in rear depending on the equipment level. Brakes are discs up front and drums in the rear, and only a five-speed manual transmission is available. Safety features such as airbags and ABS brakes are available at extra cost.

Sales in Latin America began in July 2008, as the car entered the Peruvian market under the name of Chevrolet N200. The N200 receives another grille and prominent Chevrolet badges. Since August 2009, the Chevrolet N200 is sold through GM's distribution network in markets in Latin America, Africa, and Arab countries.

Motorsports

A Wuling Journey in Singapore christened The Journeyman undertook multiple grassroots motorsports events around Singapore and Malaysia. The entrant to these events took the spectators by storm that a microvan could be on par with the other participants. A group of fans who labelled themselves as the Journeyfans will always show their support for the vehicle at events.

References

Hongtu
Microvans
Minivans
Cars introduced in 2007
2010s cars
Cars of China